Strictly Instrumental is the title of a recording by American folk music artists Doc Watson, Lester Flatt and Earl Scruggs, released in 1967.

Reception

Writing for Allmusic, music critic Thom Owen wrote the album "Flatt & Scruggs and Watson play with a startling fluidity — these instrumentals are so rich and skillful that vocals would have been superfluous. For lovers of instrumental bluegrass, this album is a must-hear."

Track listing
 "Pick Along" (Earl Scruggs) – 1:46
 "Nothin' To It" (Doc Watson) – 2:46
 "Evelina" (Buck Graves, Josh Lambert) – 2:00
 "Jazzing" (Lester Flatt, Earl Scruggs) – 2:02
 "Liberty" (Flatt, Scruggs) – 2:13
 "Tammy's Song" (Lester Flatt) – 1:55
 "John Hardy Was A Desperate Little Man" (A.P. Carter) – 2:14
 "Lonesome Reuben" (Earl Scruggs) – 2:19
 "Spanish Two-Step" (Bob Wills) – 1:58
 "Careless Love" (W. C. Handy, Martha Koenig, Spencer Williams) – 1:55
 "Bill Cheatham" (Traditional) – 2:35

Personnel
Doc Watson – guitar
Earl Scruggs – banjo
Lester Flatt – guitar
Grady Martin - guitar
Charlie McCoy - harmonica
Buddy Harman - snare drum
Josh "Buck" Graves - dobro
Paul Warren - fiddle
Jake Tullock - bass

Production
Producers: Don Law, Frank Jones
Liner Notes: Robert Shelton
Cover art: Thomas B. Allen

References

External links
Doc Watson discography

1967 albums
Doc Watson albums
Earl Scruggs albums
Lester Flatt albums
Instrumental albums
Columbia Records albums